Vienna is a light rail station operated by Santa Clara Valley Transportation Authority (VTA) in Sunnyvale, California. This station is served by the Orange Line of the VTA Light Rail system. No bus connections are available at this location.

Service

Station layout

References

External links 

Santa Clara Valley Transportation Authority light rail stations
Transportation in Sunnyvale, California
Railway stations in the United States opened in 1999
1999 establishments in California